The Sumatran serow (Capricornis sumatraensis sumatraensis), also known as the southern serow, is a subspecies of the mainland serow native to mountain forests in the Thai-Malay Peninsula and on the Indonesian island of Sumatra. It was previously considered its own species, but is now grouped under the mainland serow (Capricornis sumatraensis), as all the mainland species of serow (Chinese, red and Himalayan) were previously considered subspecies of this species. The Sumatran serow is threatened due to habitat loss and hunting, leading to it being evaluated as vulnerable by the IUCN.

References

External links
SUMATRAN SEROW Capricornis sumatraensis sumatraensis (Bechstein, 1799) 

Sumatran serow
Fauna of Sumatra
Vulnerable fauna of Asia
Sumatran serow